Dimmi Argus is heavy metal band, created in 2007 by Dimmi Argus (birth name Dimitar Argirov), a Bulgarian singer, songwriter and producer, known for being the lead singer of the Bulgarian rock band Epizod. He is the son of the famous Bulgarian folklore singer Iliya Argirov and influenced by his father performs the songs from his folklore repertoire as well. In the beginning this is a solo project. First EP and DVD was recorded in Bulgaria. Later members of Italian band Loghart joined to band.

Members
Dimmi Argus - vocals, keyboards
Filippo Spezia - bass
Matteo Calza - lead guitar
Andrea Cassinari - drums

Former members
Simone Cordani – lead guitar

Guest musicians
Dragomir Draganov - lead guitar
Plamen Uzunov - lead guitar
Graziano "Il Conte" Demurtas - lead guitar
Stoian Petrov - drums

Discography

Studio albums
 2013 - Bad Dream (LP)

Extended plays
 2010 - Black And White (EP)
 2014 - Radio Edits (EP)

Video albums
 2011 - Live at the Rock Bar Fans (Live DVD)

Singles
 2012 - Wish I Could (Single)
 2014 - Devoyko Mari Hubava (Single)
 2016 - I Know Your Secrets (Single Edit) (Single)
 2018 - Ne moga da se spra! (Single Edit) (Single)

References

 Interview with Dimmi Argus (in Bulgarian) 
 Epizod's official website
 Milano cultura e arte article (in Italian)
 Article in the Bulgarian site Izvesten.com (in Bulgarian)
 Article at the Bulgarian site Fortissimo (in Bulgarian)
 Dimitar Argirov bio at Signal.bg 
 Dimmi Argus with new single in Italy (In Bulgarian)
 Info for the new single and the upcoming album of Dimmi Argus (In Bulgarian)
 Dimmi Argus: nuovo singolo online (In Italian)
 Dimmi Argus - Wish I Could - new single info

External links
 Dimmi Argus’s official website 
 Dimitar Argirov's official website 
 Double D Music's official website
 Tanzan Music's Official site
 Dimmi Argus at Bulgarian Rock Archives

Bulgarian rock singers
Italian musical groups
Musical groups established in 2007